Budana is a village in the Narnaund tehsil of Hisar district of Haryana state in India.

Demographic
As per 2011 census of India, it has a population of 2483, 1295 are males and 1188 females, in 504 families  with an Average Sex Ratio of 917 and literacy rate of 78.53%.

Administration
As it is governed by the local village panchayat under the Panchayati raj system headed by a Sarpanch.

Notable personalities
  Pooja Dhanda, Olympic wrestler

See also
 Balali 
 Kanwari

References 

Villages in Hisar district